USS Sheepscot (AOG-24) was a Mettawee-class gasoline tanker acquired by the U.S. Navy for the dangerous task of transporting gasoline to warships in the fleet, and to remote Navy stations.

Sheepscot, as Androscoggin, was laid down under Maritime Commission contract on 15 December 1943 by the East Coast Shipyard, Inc., Bayonne, New Jersey; launched on 9 April 1944; sponsored by Mrs. John J. Gogan; (MC hull 2629) was acquired by the Navy on 13 June 1944; and commissioned on 27 June 1944.

World War II service 

After brief service in the Atlantic Ocean, the gasoline tanker was transferred to the Pacific Ocean.

Capsized near Iwo Jima 

Sheepscot ran aground and capsized near Iwo Jima on 6 June 1945. She was damaged beyond repair and was destroyed. Her name was struck from the Navy list on 1 November 1945.

Military awards and honors 

Sheepscot’s crew was eligible for the following:
 American Campaign Medal
 Asiatic-Pacific Campaign Medal
 World War II Victory Medal

References

External links 
 NavSource Online: Service Ship Photo Archive - AOG-24 Sheepscot

 

Mettawee-class gasoline tankers
Type T1-M-A2 tankers of the United States Navy
Ships built in Bayonne, New Jersey
1944 ships
World War II auxiliary ships of the United States
World War II shipwrecks in the Pacific Ocean
Maritime incidents in June 1945